The Dibis (Dibbis) Dam or Dibis Regulator is a gravel-alluvial fill embankment dam located on Lesser Zab River approximately 130 km upstream from its confluence with the Tigris River. The dam is located directly north of the town of Dibis in Kirkuk Governorate, Iraq.  The main-purpose of the Dibis Dam is to divert water from the Lesser Zab River into the Kirkuk Irrigation Project.

The Dibis Dam was constructed between 1960 and 1965 as part of the larger Kirkuk Irrigation Project for the irrigation of 300,000 ha of land. The dam has a capacity of 4,000 m3 through the spillway and 278 m3 through the head regulator (diversion to the Kirkuk Irrigation Project).
Inflow is from Dokan Dam, approximately 140 km upstream. In 1984 the dam failed due to heavy outflows from the Dokan Dam. The fuse-plug that allows the emergency spillway to work did not erode because heavy sediment had built up behind it. Repairs were carried out by China International Water and Electric Cooperation between October 1985 and March 1987.

See also
List of dams and reservoirs in Iraq

References

Dams in Iraq
Dams on the Little Zab River
Embankment dams
Kirkuk Governorate
Geography of Iraq
Dams completed in 1965
1965 establishments in Iraq